Akhmim (Akhmimic , ; Sahidic/Bohairic  ) is a city in the Sohag Governorate of Upper Egypt. Referred to by the ancient Greeks as Khemmis or Chemmis and Panopolis, it is located on the east bank of the Nile,  to the northeast of Sohag.

History 

Akhmim was known in Ancient Egypt as Ipu, Apu (according to Brugsch the name is related to the nearby village of Kafr Abou) or Khent-min. It was the capital of the ninth (Chemmite) nome of Upper Egypt. The city is a suggested hometown for Yuya, the official of Tuthmosis IV and Amenhotep III. The ithyphallic Min (whom the Greeks identified with Pan) was worshipped here as "the strong Horus." Herodotus mentions the temple dedicated to Perseus and asserts that Chemmis was remarkable for the celebration of games in honor of that hero, after the manner of the Greeks, at which prizes were given; as a matter of fact some representations are known of Nubians and people of Punt (southern coastal Sudan and the Eritrean coast) clambering up poles before the god Min. Min was especially a god of the desert routes on the east of Egypt, and the trading tribes are likely to have gathered to his festivals for business and pleasure at Coptos (which was really near Neapolis) even more than at Akhmim. Herodotus perhaps confused Coptos with Chemmis. Strabo mentions linen-weaving and stone-cutting as ancient industries of Panopolis, and it is not altogether a coincidence that the cemetery of Akhmim is one of the chief sources of the beautiful textiles of Roman and Christian age, that are brought from Egypt.

In the Christian Coptic era, Akhmim was written in Sahidic   but was probably pronounced locally something like Khmin or Khmim. Monasteries abounded in this region from a very early date. Shenouda the Archimandrite (348–466) was a monk at Athribis near Akhmim. Some years earlier Nestorius, the exiled ex-patriarch of Constantinople, had died at an old age in the neighborhood of Akhmim. Nonnus, the Greek poet, was born at Panopolis at the end of the 4th century. The bishopric of Panopolis, a suffragan of Antinoë in Thebais Prima, is included in the Catholic Church's list of titular sees. Among the bishops of Panopolis, Le Quien mentions  Arius, friend of Saint Pachomius who had built three convents in the city, Sabinus, and Menas. Excavations at Akhmim have disclosed numerous Christian manuscripts, among them fragments of the Book of Henoch, of the Gospel, and of the Apocalypse of Peter, the Acts of the Council of Ephesus, as well as numerous other Christian inscriptions.

In the 13th century AD, a very imposing temple still stood in Akhmim. Today, little of its past glory remains. Nothing is left of the town, the temples were almost completely dismantled, and their material reused in the later Middle Ages. The extensive cemeteries of ancient Akhmim are yet to be fully explored. The destroyed corner of a Greco-Roman period temple with colossal statues of Ramesses II and Meritamen was discovered in 1981.

Climate
Köppen-Geiger climate classification system classifies its climate as hot desert (BWh).

Modern city 
Akhmim is the largest town on the east side of the Nile in Upper Egypt. In 1907, the population of the city was 23,795, of whom about one third were Copts. Akhmim has several mosques and two Coptic churches. The Monastery of the Martyrs is located about 6 km northeast of the city. Akhmim maintains a weekly market, and manufactures cotton goods, notably the blue shirts and check shawls with silk fringes worn by the poorer classes of Egypt. Outside the walls are the scanty ruins of two ancient temples. On the west bank of the Nile opposite of Akhmim, there is railway communication with Cairo and Aswan.

Notable people
 Nakhtmin, 13th Dynasty priest
 Yuya and Tjuyu, parents of Queen Tiye, Anen and possibly Pharaoh Ay
 Tiye ( BC1338 BC), Great Royal Wife of the Egyptian pharaoh Amenhotep III
 Anen, Second Prophet of Amun and brother of Queen Tiye
 Ay, Pharaoh from 1323 to 1319 BC or 1327–1323 BC
 Nakhtmin, general, appointed heir of Ay
 Sennedjem, official under Tutankhamun
 Amenemope, author of Instructions of Amenemope
 Nefrina, woman who died in 275 BCE, her mummy is in the Reading Public Museum, Pennsylvania
 Zosimos of Panopolis, 3rd/4th century alchemist
 Tryphiodorus, 3rd/4th century epic poet
 Cyrus of Panopolis, (Flavius Taurus Seleucus Cyrus; fl. 426–441) East Roman official, philosopher, poet
 Pamprepius (440–484) philosopher, poet, rebel against Emperor Zeno
 Abib and Apollo, 4th century martyrs
 Nonnus, 5th century poet
 Veronica of Syria, 8th century nun, martyr
 Dhul-Nun al-Misri, 9th century Sufi saint
 Muhammed ibn Umail al-Tamimi (900–960) alchemist
 Bahram al-Armani Fatimid vizier (1135–1137) was exiled here
 Al-Nuwayri (1279–1333) Arab historian, encyclopedist
 Yousab El Abah (1735–1826), bishop of Akhmim, theologian, saint
 Maximos Sedfaoui (1863–1925), Apostolic Administrator of the Coptic Catholic Church 
 Markos II Khouzam (1888–1958), Patriarch of Alexandria (1947–1958)

See also
 List of cities and towns in Egypt
 Berlin Codex
 el-Hawawish
 el-Salamuni

References

Further reading

External links 
 More about Akmim's Martyrs - Saint Takla Haymanout Church, Egypt

Archaeological sites in Egypt
Populated places in Sohag Governorate
Cities in Egypt
Catholic titular sees in Africa